Robertson College is a private Canadian career training institution headquartered in Winnipeg, Canada.  Robertson has campus locations in Winnipeg in Manitoba and Edmonton and Calgary in Alberta. Robertson offers diploma and certificate programs.

Campuses
Robertson College has three physical campuses in Canada, located in Winnipeg, Calgary, and Edmonton. Robertson College also has an online campus which offers much of the same programming.

History

Founding 
Founded in 1911, Robertson College evolved when Mary Irvine Robertson initiated plans to begin a court-reporting business with her sister who at the time was already living in Saskatoon, Saskatchewan. In Edinburgh, Scotland Mrs. Robertson had worked as a shorthand stenographer and reporter in the city hall. She and her young daughter emigrated to Canada in 1912. 1913 saw the start of Mrs. Robertson and her sister's court reporting business, the Dominion Stenographic Service. In 1919, the judicial courts began to hire their own shorthand stenographers which then helped evolve the business into a shorthand school.

By 1921, the Saskatoon Henderson Directory had begun to advertise the business as the Dominion Business College. By 1923, the school was being advertised as the Robertson Shorthand and Secretarial School. Mr. Don Thomas purchased the school in 1986, rebranding the business to that of the Robertson Career College, establishing additional campuses in Winnipeg, Brandon and Regina. The school, now college, was then taken into post-secondary technology and education along with updated curricula and expanded program offerings.

In 1990, Mr. Thomas restructured the college with the sole campus becoming that of the Winnipeg, Manitoba campus.

Robertson Today 
In 1993, the Robertson Career College was formally renamed to its present name, Robertson College as it continued to diversify its program offerings. The college was purchased in 2001 by the Midwestern School of Business and Technology in Winnipeg; it now has since become a multi-campus college with campuses added in Calgary (2004) and in Edmonton.  In 2009, an online training division for Robertson College was created. Robertson Online offers flexible learning with an expanding catalog of diploma and certificate programs as well as micro courses.

The College now focuses on Business, Technology, Healthcare and Community Services.

Further Information 

The College is registered as a Private Vocational Institution with the Government of Manitoba as well as the Government of Alberta Advanced Education – Private Career Colleges Branch.

Robertson is also a member of:
Long Term & Continuing Care Association of Manitoba
CCAPP (Canadian Council for Accreditation of Pharmacy Programs)
Massage Therapy Association of Manitoba (MTAM)
Canadian Council of Massage Therapy Schools
Canadian Payroll Association (CPA)
Calgary Chamber of Commerce
Winnipeg Chamber of Commerce
Edmonton Chamber of Commerce

See also
List of colleges in Manitoba
List of colleges in Alberta
List of colleges in Ontario
Private education in Canada

References

External links
Robertson College website

Colleges in Manitoba
Universities and colleges in Winnipeg
Universities and colleges in Calgary
Colleges in Alberta
Universities and colleges in Edmonton
Schools in downtown Winnipeg